Lieutenant General Sir Wilfrid Gordon Lindsell  (29 September 1884 – 2 May 1973) was a senior British Army logistics officer in the Second World War.

Early life and military career
General Lindsell was born in Portsmouth, a son of Colonel Robert Frederick Lindsell and Kathleen, née Eaton, educated at Birkenhead School, Victoria College, Jersey. He was commissioned into the Royal Garrison Artillery from Royal Military Academy, Woolwich in 1903.  After gunnery school, he served in Malta before he was sent as ADC to the Governor-General of Tasmania, Major General Sir Harry Barron, and then Western Australia.  On the outbreak of war he returned home and served in France and Belgium between 1914 and 1918 as a staff captain in the Royal Artillery, then as brigade major.  He was four times mentioned in dispatches, on 1 January 1918, and was awarded the Military Cross in 1916, DSO in 1918, Croix de Guerre in 1918 and OBE in 1919.

Between the wars
In 1919 he attended the first post-war course at the Staff College, Camberley, and was then appointed a Deputy Assistant Adjutant-General in the War Office before spending four years as an instructor at the School of Military Administration from 1921 to 1925. While there he wrote the first edition of the textbook Military Organisation and Administration (published in 1923) that lasted through 29 editions into the 1960s. After this he was appointed instructor in military administration at the Staff College 1925–1928. Attendance at the Imperial Defence College in 1930 was followed by a post as General Staff Officer Grade 1 at the War Office, 1930–1933. In 1931 he became a full colonel and in 1933 he became a brigadier and commandant of the Senior Officers School in Sheerness, then deputy military secretary in the War Office 1935–1936, before becoming commander of Royal Artillery 4th Division, 1937-1938.

Second World War
He was promoted to major-general in command of Administration for Southern Command, 1938–1939 and was appointed the quartermaster-general on mobilisation of the  British Expeditionary Force in France and Belgium, 1939–1940, until the evacuation from Dunkirk. After Dunkirk he became quartermaster-general of Home Forces and set about re-building the army from Kneller Hall in Twickenham. After a year he became senior military advisor to the Ministry of Supply under Sir Andrew Duncan and Lord Beaverbrook. In less than a year the army had thirteen fully equipped and trained divisions to repel a German invasion. In 1942 he became one of General Montgomery's team to revitalise the Eighth Army as lieutenant-general in charge of administration in GHQ Middle East. In a broadcast concerning the capture of Tripoli the British Secretary for War, Sir P.J. Grigg, said that much of the credit for the Eighth Army's phenomenal advance was due to the quartermaster-general's staff under Lt General Sir Wilfrid Lindsell. During the Second World War he was mentioned in dispatches on three more occasions.

At the end of 1943 he moved east to become principal administrative officer in GHQ India prepared General Slim's Fourteenth Army to attack the Japanese in Burma.  Here he played the most significant role in mobilising Indian resources, establishing production capabilities and building the foundations for the Indian defence industry. After returning from India he was attached to the Board of Trade to co-ordinate the clearing of factories for peacetime production.

Postwar
He retired from the army in December 1945. He was awarded the Legion of Merit honour by the American government with Degree of Commander on 17 October 1946.

He became governor and commandant of the Church Lads' Brigade (1948–1954) and was a Church Commissioner (1948–1959). From 1946 to 1955 he was chairman of the board of Ely Breweries. He was awarded an honorary doctorate by Aberdeen University.

He married Marjorie Ellis (died 1957) (OBE 1946). They had two daughters and a son who died in infancy. In 1958 he married Evelyn Nairn (died 1982). He died in London on 2 May 1973.

Publications
Military Organisation and Administration, 1943, publ. Gale & Polden Ltd

Bibliography

References

External links
Generals of World War II

1884 births
1973 deaths
Military personnel from Portsmouth
Graduates of the Royal College of Defence Studies
British Army generals of World War II
British Army personnel of World War I
Commandants of the Senior Officers' School, Sheerness
Commanders of the Legion of Merit
Companions of the Distinguished Service Order
Foreign recipients of the Legion of Merit
Graduates of the Staff College, Camberley
Knights Commander of the Order of the Bath
Knights Commander of the Order of the British Empire
People educated at Birkenhead School
People educated at Victoria College, Jersey
Recipients of the Military Cross
Royal Artillery officers
British Army lieutenant generals
Academics of the Staff College, Camberley